Paternity may refer to:

Father, the male parent of a (human) child
Paternity (law), fatherhood as a matter of law
Paternity (film), a 1981 comedy film starring Burt Reynolds
"Paternity" (House), a 2004 episode of the television series House

See also

Parental leave, also called paternity leave, a leave of absence taken to allow a father to attend to family needs associated with fatherhood
Lauren Lake's Paternity Court, a tabloid television talk/court show hybrid